Gösta Adrian-Nilsson (2 April 1884 in Lund - 29 Mars 1965 in Stockholm), usually referred to as GAN, was a Swedish artist and writer. He is regarded as a pioneer of the Swedish modernist art movement.

Personal experiences 
He was born in a farming family in Southern Sweden. He was debuted as an artist in 1907 from an Art exhibition in the University of Lund.  

He then went to Technical Company School and then to Kristian Zahrtmann's School in Copenhagen.  

He then travelled in the year 1913 to Berlin. There he came in contact with abstract art, futurism and cubism, something that had a major impact on his own art. Gösta Adrian-Nilsson became a pioneer for radical art in 1910 and 20th century Sweden.

Career 
GAN influenced members of the Halmstad Group (Halmstadgruppen). Through an old friend of GAN, the railway engineer Egon Östlund, he was reunited with his cousins Axel and Erik Olson and Waldemar Lorentzon. In the year 1928 he got to know Sven Jonson and Esaias Thorén, and in particular Thorén became a greater admirer of GAN. Especially his surrealistic phase influenced them, but also his motifs of seamen's life.

His later works approached romanticism, inspired by the landscape painter Marcus Larson. In addition to oil paintings, he also produced some watercolour works, and wrote poems, short stories and children's books.

The fact that GAN was gay was reflected in many of his works. For example, for periods he was fixated by sailors and adored masculine strength. Another favorite motif was sportsmen. At the same time, the homosexual eroticism was both illegal and a taboo and GAN was forced to live a double life.

GAN is represented at the Nationalmuseum and the Moderna Museet in Stockholm, Gothenburg's Art Museum, Malmö Art Museum, Waldemarsudde and Kulturen in Lund. In the last mentioned museum GAN's works and those of Wiwen Nilsson constitute a permanent exhibition of modernistic art. His writings are preserved at the University Library of Lund.

Death 
GAN passed away in stockholm on 29 Mar. 1965 and he was buried at the cemetery of Norra kyrkogården in Lund.

Art work

References 

Swedish male painters
1884 births
1965 deaths
Swedish gay artists
Swedish LGBT painters
Gay painters